The abbreviation NCDA may refer to:
National Career Development Association
Northstar Corridor Development Authority
National Council on Disability Affairs (Philippines)
NOID Check Digit Algorithm